Five Go Off To Camp is the seventh novel in the Famous Five children's adventure series by Enid Blyton. It was first published in 1948, and was followed by a number of reprints and translations. The story revolves around mysterious "spook trains" that the Five hear about on a lonely moor. The book has been adapted to two television series.

Plot
Julian, Dick, George (Georgina by rights), Anne and Timmy (Timothy) the dog are planning to go camping in a moor with the absent-minded and insect-loving Mr Luffy, a master at Julian and Dick's school. When they arrive at camp they find that their camping site is close to a farm. They discover several old railway tracks that run under the moors, some of them unused. They soon make friends with a boy named Jock, who lives at the farm with his mother and stepfather. While exploring the moor, the five find a railway yard and a tunnel that are apparently abandoned. A watchman called Wooden Leg Sam tells them that "Spook trains" travel along those tracks before chasing them away.

The children visit the farm the next day and tell Jock about the spook trains. Jock has a sissy of a boy called Cecil Dearlove inflicted on him who forces him to play "soldiers" with him all day. Jock retaliates by forcing him to play "Red Indians", scaring him in the process. In return, Jock is forced to stay in his room all day. His stepfather intended to cane him, but his mother wouldn't let him because "that would only make Jock hate his stepfather". They are surprised to find that most of the farm labourers are not working properly although Jock's stepfather, Mr Andrews, has supplied the farm with a lot of expensive equipment and vehicles. When Mr Andrews hears about the spook trains, he warns the children to stay away from the railway yard, and tries to prevent Jock from meeting the Five over the next few days. 
 
Julian and Dick secretly set off with Jock the next two nights to watch for the spook train, leaving the girls behind. They find that there is indeed a mysterious train coming from and back into the tunnel. The next day, George is furious when she finds that the boys had left them behind, and even takes out her anger on Anne: "If you weren't such a coward, if you hadn't been too frightened to come, I'd have been able to go too!" she says. She later apologises to them all for her behaviour, but that night sets a trap that doesn't work. Refusing to join the others the next day, she goes off with Timmy to try to find the spook trains by herself. She does find one, which enters a secret area behind a supposedly blocked-off section of the tunnel. Meanwhile, the boys explore the tunnel while Anne waits outside, but they are captured by some men led by Mr Andrews. Anne runs off to find Mr Luffy, but gets lost on her way. Eventually she does find him, along with some police officers that are helping him search for the missing Five. George, who had been hiding inside the train, rescues the boys, and realising that the train is used for smuggling, they try to find a way out of the tunnel. They are recaptured, but just in time, Anne arrives with Mr Luffy and the police to free them. After being rounded up by Timmy, the criminals are arrested, and the Famous Five return to the farm, while Jock is delighted at the adventure: "It was simply...smashing!" he says, borrowing Dick's favourite word.(in the  Famous Five television series)

Adaptations
Five Go Off to Camp was adapted for an episode of the Famous Five television series in 1978, produced by Southern Television for ITV. In 1996, another Famous Five television series featured the story, and was first aired on 29 July 1996.

Five Go Off to Camp has also been adapted for a radio drama, while the gamebook The Haunted Railway Game (1983) was based on this novel.

References

External links
 

1947 British novels
Hodder & Stoughton books
Famous Five novels
1947 children's books